Mark Fox may refer to:

 Mark S. Fox (born 1952), Canadian computer scientist
 Mark I. Fox (born 1956), United States Navy officer
 Mark Fox (basketball) (born 1969), American basketball coach
 Mark Fox (footballer) (born 1975), English footballer

See also
Marcus Fox (disambiguation)